People surnamed Lemon:

 Arthur Lemon (1905-1982), Wales international rugby player
 Bob Lemon (1920–2000), American Major League Baseball pitcher
 Sir Charles Lemon (1784–1868), 2nd Baronet, British Member of Parliament
 Chet Lemon (born 1955), American Major League Baseball Player
 Cleo Lemon (born 1979) NFL free agent quarterback
 Don Lemon (born 1966), CNN broadcaster
 Dot Lemon (1907–1986), American aviator
 George William Lemon (1726–1797), English etymologist
 James Lemon (1903–1977), co-owner of the Washington Senators
 Jim Lemon (1928–2006), American Major League Baseball player 
 John Lemon (1754–1814), British Member of Parliament, brother of Sir William Lemon
 John Lemon (prospector), 19th-century prospector in Alaska
 Keith Lemon, a character played by comedian Leigh Francis
 Leslie R. Lemon (1948-2020), American meteorologist
 Liz Lemon, character on the situation comedy 30 Rock
Margaretta Louisa Lemon (1860-1953), known as "Etta"), ornithologist and founder member of RSPB
 Mark Lemon (1809–1870), editor of the British weekly Punch
 Mark Lemon (speedway rider) (born 1973), Australian speedway rider
 Meadowlark Lemon (1932–2015), American basketball player and actor
 Percy Lemon (1898–1932), British polar explorer
 Shawn Lemon (born 1988), American football player
 Walt Lemon Jr. (born 1992), American basketball player in the Israel Basketball Premier League
 Wayne Lemon, American playwright and screenwriter
 Sir William Lemon (1748–1824), 1st Baronet Lemon of Carclew, British Member of Parliament.

See also
 Lemons (surname)
 Lemon (disambiguation)
 Lemmon (disambiguation)